Brachinus alexandri is a species of ground beetle from the Brachininae subfamily that can be found in Ukraine, southern part of Russia, Near East, Albania, Armenia, Azerbaijan, Asia Minor, Turkey, Bulgaria, Greece, The species are  in length, and have black eyes and body, with orange head and legs.

References

Beetles described in 1984
Beetles of Asia
Beetles of Europe
Brachininae